Manoj Tyagi (born 1968
) is an Indian screenwriter and film director in the Hindi cinema. He had won the National Film Award for Best Screenplay twice, for Page 3 (2005) and Apaharan (2006), apart from Filmfare Award for Best Screenplay for Page 3, which won the National Film Award for Best Feature Film. He made his directorial debut with Mumbai Salsa (2007) produced by Vikram Bhatt's ASA Films for whom he had written a couple of films.

Early life and education
Born and brought up in Delhi, Tyagi is an MBA.

Career
He started career in the corporate world, working for companies like, Xerox, Canon and ABN AMRO Bank when he shifted to Mumbai in 2002. Meanwhile, he started looking for opening the film world has a screenwriter which came as co-writing Satta, with Madhur Bhandarkar, which received critical acclaim. Over the years, he has worked extensively, National Film Award-winning director, Madhur Bhandarkar, in films like, Aan: Men at Work (2004), National Film Award-winningPage 3 (2005), Corporate (2006) and Jail (2009).

Filmography
 Satta (2003) (screenplay)
 Agnipankh (2004) (screenplay)
 Aan: Men at Work (2004) (screenplay) (story)
 Page 3 (2005) (screenplay)
 Apaharan (2005) (screenplay)
 Ek Ajnabee (2005) (dialogue) (screenplay)
 Pehchaan: The Face of Truth (2005)
 Taxi No. 9211 (2006) (screenplay)
 Corporate (2006) (screenplay)
 Red: The Dark Side (2007) (writer)
 Life Mein Kabhie Kabhiee (2007) (screenplay)
 Victoria No. 203 (2007) (adaptation)
 Mumbai Salsa (2007) (direction, screenplay & story)
 Jail (2009) (screenplay)
 Heroine (2012) (writer)
 Inkaar (2013) (writer)

References

External links

 
 Manoj Tyagi at Bollywood Hungama

Living people
Indian male screenwriters
Filmfare Awards winners
Writers from Delhi
1974 births
Hindi-language film directors
21st-century Indian dramatists and playwrights
Hindi screenwriters
Screenwriters from Delhi
21st-century Indian male writers
Best Original Screenplay National Film Award winners
21st-century Indian screenwriters